The 2017 Kansas State Wildcats football team represented Kansas State University in the 2017 NCAA Division I FBS football season. The Wildcats played their home games at the Bill Snyder Family Football Stadium in Manhattan, Kansas, and competed in the Big 12 Conference. They were led by 26th-year head coach Bill Snyder. They finished the season 8–5, 5–4 in Big 12 play to finish in a four-way tie for fourth place. They were invited to the Cactus Bowl where they defeated UCLA.

Season

Pre Season
In January 2017 it was reported by many Kansas media outlets that Bill Snyder has been traveling to Houston, Texas for treatment for a "serious life-threatening ailment". On February 12, 2017 Snyder announced that he has been diagnosed with throat cancer and had been receiving treatment in Manhattan, as well at University of Kansas Medical Center, and in Houston, Texas. He said that his doctor expect a recovery and that he should be able to coach by the 2017 Wildcats Spring Game. Also on February 12, 2017 it was announced that Co-Offensive Coordinator Del Miller would be retiring, putting the other Co-Offensive Coordinator Dana Dimel at the helm as the only OC and play caller for KSU, and Collin Klein would return to KSU to take over the Quarterback Coach position.

End Of Season
On December 6, 2017 it was announced that Offensive Coordinator Dana Dimel was hired as the new head coach for UTEP. It was also said that he will be fulfilling his final OC duties for KSU while participating in the Cactus Bowl.

Schedule
Kansas State announced its 2017 football schedule on December 13, 2016. The 2017 schedule consisted of seven home and five away games in the regular season. The Wildcats hosted Big 12 foes Baylor, Iowa State, Oklahoma, TCU, and West Virginia, and traveled to Kansas, Oklahoma State, Texas, and Texas Tech.

The Wildcats hosted two of the three non-conference opponents, Central Arkansas from the Southland Conference and Charlotte from Conference USA and traveled to Vanderbilt from the Southeastern Conference.

The team accepted the bowl bid to participate in the Cactus Bowl and faced UCLA in a bowl game for the second time. The first bowl meeting was in the Alamo Bowl with UCLA winning 40–35.

Rankings

References

Kansas State
Kansas State Wildcats football seasons
Guaranteed Rate Bowl champion seasons
Kansas State Wildcats football